St Michael the Archangel’s Church, Laxton is a Grade I listed Church of England parish in the Diocese of Southwell and Nottingham in Laxton, Nottinghamshire.

History

The church dates from the 13th century. It was the home church of the Everingham Barons in the thirteenth and fourteenth centuries and contains several of their stone monuments.

It was restored in 1859 and 1860 by Thomas Chambers Hine and Robert Evans.

It is in a group of parishes comprising:
St Swithin’s Church, Wellow
St Bartholomew’s Church, Kneesall
Moorhouse Chantry Chapel

Organ

The church has an organ dating from 1870 by Wadsworth. A specification of the organ can be found on the National Pipe Organ Register.

References

External links
 , Everingham & other monuments

Grade I listed churches in Nottinghamshire
Church of England church buildings in Nottinghamshire